Mazayen al-Ibl, also known as the King Abdel Aziz Festival, is a beauty pageant for camels put on by the Qahtani tribe of Saudi Arabia. It is held in Guwei'iyya yearly. In 2007, 250 owners participated, showing a total of more than 1,500 camels. Participants come from every Gulf country except Oman, and from every region of Saudi Arabia except the south-western mountain region, where there are no camel breeders. The competition is held in respect to the role of camels in Bedouin history, and to preserve purebred camel strains. No pageant was planned in 2020.

Four varieties of camel participate in the show: the majaheem, which is black; the maghateer, which is white; the shi'l, which is dark brown; and the sulfur, which is beige with black shoulders. There is strict health testing and veterinarians present at the event. The event is supported by the King and Crown Prince Sultan.

Prizes are awarded to the most beautiful camels in four categories based on the number of camels entered by the owner: groups of 100, 50, 10, and individual camels. The beauty of the camel is based on the "size of its head; whether its lips cover its teeth, the length of its neck and the roundness of its hump" and "big eyes, long lashes and a long neck." "The nose should be long and droop down, that's more beautiful [...] The ears should stand back, and the neck should be long. The hump should be high, but slightly to the back." The most beautiful camel is called the "Bayraq" and can fetch prices of up to $3 million US dollars. In 2007, prizes included 10 million riyals and 72 sports utility vehicles. The winning camels may also sell for prices exceeding one million riyals. There are parts of the festival dedicated to camel trading, where millions of dollars change hands every day.

Some members of more stringent Muslim schools have accused the shows as being evil, and have stated that those who participate should "seek redemption in God". In addition, some breeders refuse to take part in the competition, saying that it has become too commercial because wealthy businessmen, who have no interest in preserving the breeds and are only interested in fame, have started to enter. There are also dances, feasts, and parties during the festival, as well as youth camel shows.

A similar contest in Abu Dhabi is the al-Dhafra Festival, which also awards prizes to the best milking camels and hosts camel races. This festival focuses on Asayel (local camels) and Majahim (dark skinned camels), and also features falcon hunting, Saluki and Arabian horse races, and date packing contests.
As seen above the importance of PHN’s preparedness in a biological disaster cannot be overstated. Given this, there is need to continuously improve the level of preparation of nurses to ensure effective response in the event of any a biological disaster. This calls for a thorough investigation on the weak links on preparedness to identify areas where resources can be directed to enhance or improve the situation. Identifying areas of concern is also essential in developing a framework that can be essential in providing the blueprints to optimize the level of preparedness in an event of biological disaster.
Preparedness is the key to effective disaster management in any area. Several studies have examined PHNs' preparedness for biological disaster management, stressing on three elements:  knowledge, skills, and attitudes. A study by Sultan et al. (2020) found that PHNs in South Korea had a moderate level of knowledge about biological disasters, but lacked practical skills and experience in managing such events. Similarly, a study by Tzeng et al. (2016) found that PHNs in Taiwan had a moderate level of knowledge about biological disasters, but lacked the exposure of dealing with such events.
Brinjee et al. (2021) carried out a study to determine current issues facing disaster nursing education in Saudi Arabia. The researchers found that PHNs in Saudi Arabia had a moderate level of knowledge and skills related to disasters management, but had limited experience in responding to such events. This study also found that PHNs had a positive attitude towards preparedness for biological disasters, but identified a need for more training and education.
Said and Chiang (2020) conducted a systematic review on preparedness of primary health care nurses for pandemics based on skills, competences and emotional strength. The study found that PHNs had limited knowledge and skills related to pandemics management, and that they perceived themselves as being poorly prepared. Further, the nurses also had insufficient psychological preparation.
Similarly, Loke et al. (2021) conducted a systematic analysis of over 75 international studies on the level of disaster preparedness among PHNs. The study critically assessed disaster management programs for the past twenty years. The studies highlighted significant inadequacy of meeting worldwide necessities in disaster education programs. A study by Nizar and Vicor (2020) that aimed to determine nurses’ preparedness for a disaster also concluded on the need for further training especially psychological as well as an enhancement of nurses’ skills and competences.
These studies suggest two major necessities to improve the level of preparedness:  education and training. As observed, most PHNs were less exposed to the disaster preparation hence, a situation which is likely exacerbated by lack of training. Education and training are essential for PHNs to be prepared for biological disaster management, however, most of the studies reported that PHNs received little education and training on biological disaster management. 
Despite the apparent importance of PHNs in general disaster management, there is still a need for further and current study on how to actually optimize PHNs’ preparedness for biological disasters. Furthermore, there is scarce research on of biological disaster management within the nursing sector. This study's goal is to identify the current crucial elements of PHNs disaster preparedness and offer the groundwork for practical suggestions on how to evaluate and enhance PHC disaster preparedness. The study will also aim to suggest a new framework of enhancing PHNs biological disaster preparedness.
Theoretical Framework or Conceptual Framework
The study will employ four-component disaster preparedness framework to evaluate the level of preparedness among the nurses. The four component includes:
•	Vulnerability assessment: Identifying the population's vulnerabilities and risk factors that can exacerbate the impact of a disaster.
•	Risk management: Developing strategies to mitigate the potential impact of disasters on the population.
•	Preparedness: Developing plans and procedures for responding to disasters and ensuring that healthcare providers are trained and equipped to respond effectively.
•	Response: Implementing the plans and procedures developed during the preparedness phase and providing immediate assistance to those affected by the disaster.
Summary 
Authors & Year	Aim	Participants	Study design	Method of administration	Data analysis	Findings
Sultan et al. (2020)	To investigate the perceptions of preparedness and willingness to work during disasters and public health emergencies among emergency healthcare provider	Emergency healthcare providers	Qualitative study	Interviews	Thematic analysis	The study found that emergency healthcare providers have varying levels of preparedness and willingness to work during disasters and public health emergencies, and that perceived preparedness is influenced by factors such as personal characteristics, job demands, and organizational support
Tzeng et al. 2016	To assess the readiness of hospital nurses for disaster responses in Taiwan	Hospital nurses in Taiwan	Cross-sectional study	Survey questionnaire	Descriptive statistics and chi-square tests were used to analyze the data	The results showed that the majority of the hospital nurses were found to be moderately ready for disaster response, but their overall readiness was lower than desired. The study identified factors such as previous training, years of experience, and age as positively associated with disaster response readiness.
Brinjee et al. 2021	The aim of the study was to identify and examine the current issues facing disaster nursing education in Saudi Arabia	N/A	Joanna Briggs Institute (JBI) methodology	N/A	N/A	The researchers noted several gaps in disaster training and preparedness among the nurses.
Said & Chiang 2020.	The aim of the study was to conduct a systematic review of the literature to examine the knowledge, skill competencies, and psychological preparedness of nurses for disasters	N/A	systematic review of the literature	N/A	Thematic analysis	The findings demonstrated the need to  enhance the psychological preparedness of nurses, in addition to knowledge and skill competencies, so that they can provide the best care possible to affected individuals as well as for themselves 
Loke et al. 2021	To examine the development of disaster nursing education and training programs over the past 20 years (2000-2019)	N/A	Systematic review	N/A	N/A	The findings of the systematic review showed the development of disaster nursing education and training programs over the past 20 years. The authors reported that there has been a growth in the number of programs, but some gaps still exist in terms of the content and delivery of the programs.
Nizar & Vicor, 2020	to evaluate nursing preparedness to disasters in terms of knowledge, skill competencies, and psychological preparedness to disasters	N/A	Systematic review 	N/A	iterative narrative process	The articles highlighted the need for additional development of nurses' disaster readiness in terms of their knowledge and technical competences, as well as a greater emphasis on nurses' education in order to improve their psychological preparedness.

Methodology

Research design
The primary goal of the proposed study is to evaluate the preparedness of primary health nurses (PHNs) for biological disaster management. The study will employ a cross-sectional study design approach.
Sample
The sample will include registered and active nurses across both private and public hospitals in KSA.
Sampling and Sample size
The preferred sampling technique is convenience sampling to save on time and resources. The study aims to have a sample size of 100 participants.

Setting
The research will mainly be conducted via web-survey tools hence not constrained to a specific location. However, participants are required to be within KSA as one of the main inclusion criteria of the study.
Data collection procedure 
The primary data collection instrument to be used in the study will be questionnaires. Questionnaires will be distributed electronically using a web-based survey tool, and will be available in multiple languages to ensure that all participants can respond. It will be developed and distributed to PHNs to assess their level of knowledge, skills, and attitudes related to biological disaster management. The questionnaires will include questions on education and training, experience with biological disasters, and self-perceived preparedness.
Instruments
The primary data collection instrument to be used in the study will be Disaster Preparedness Evaluation Tool (DPET). DPET is preferred for its reliability in evaluating the perception of nurse practitioners about their knowledge and skills related to disaster preparedness, response, and recovery.
Ethical considerations
The primary ethical considerations of the study will include informed consent, voluntary participation and data privacy. The samples of the study will be informed about the nature of the survey and what their participation will entail. This shall include providing them with clear, easy-to-understand information about the survey's purpose, what questions will be asked, and how the data will be used (Hasan et al., 2021). Also participants will be informed on the risks and benefits of participating, and that they are free to withdraw from the study at any time.
Secondly, confidentiality and data privacy will be upheld accordingly. The study’s facilitators will take steps to protect participants’ personal information, such as using pseudonyms or anonymous codes instead of real names, and ensuring that the data is stored securely. The study’s facilitators will also consider the potential harms that could arise from the survey, such as causing emotional distress or violating participants' privacy, and to take steps to minimize these risks.
Data Analysis
The data collected from the surveys will be analyzed by SPSS, a statistical software efficient in analyzing qualitative data. The analysis is vital to identify trends and patterns in the data or even provide an essential theme for the study. This will involve descriptive statistics to summarize the data and data triangulation. Data triangulation is essential in compiling information from literature review and questionnaires to form a common focal point of the study and provide a more comprehensive understanding of the preparedness of PHNs for biological disaster management. The results will further be used to recommend a new framework to improve biological disaster management strategies.

 
Gantt Chart
	
	Week 1- 2	Week 3	Week 4-6	Week 7-8	Week 9 & 10
Research primaries & approval					
Training					
Data Collection					
Data analysis, Interpretation & Conclusion 					
Report compilation & new framework recommendation.

References

Camels
Agricultural shows
Abu-Odah, H., Molassiotis, A., & Liu, J. (2020). Challenges on the provision of palliative care for patients with cancer in low- and middle-income countries: A systematic review of reviews. BMC Palliative Care, 19(1). https://doi.org/10.1186/s12904-020-00558-5
Alshammary, S. A., Duraisamy, B., Albalawi, Y., & Ratnapalan, S. (2019). Development of palliative and end of life care: the current situation in Saudi Arabia. Cureus, 11(3).
Bernal, D., Campos-Serna, J., Tobias, A., Vargas-Prada, S., Benavides, F. G., & Serra, C. (2015). Work-related psychosocial risk factors and musculoskeletal disorders in hospital nurses and nursing aides: A systematic review and meta-analysis. International Journal of Nursing Studies, 52(2), 635-648. https://doi.org/10.1016/j.ijnurstu.2014.11.003
Curie, M. (2017). Doctors need more support to manage anxiety in terminally-ill patients. Press release, 19
Faria, C. D., Alves, H. V., & Charchat-Fichman, H. (2015). The most frequently used tests for assessing executive functions in aging. Dementia & Neuropsychologia, 9(2), 149-155. https://doi.org/10.1590/1980-57642015dn92000009
Festic, E., Wilson, M. E., Gajic, O., Divertie, G. D., & Rabatin, J. T. (2011). Perspectives of physicians and nurses regarding end-of-life care in the intensive care unit. Journal of Intensive Care Medicine, 27(1), 45-54. https://doi.org/10.1177/0885066610393465
Hussain, F. A. (2021). Psychological challenges for nurses working in palliative care and recommendations for self-care. British Journal of Nursing, 30(8), 484-489.
Hussain, F. A. (2021). Psychological challenges for nurses working in palliative care and recommendations for self-care. British Journal of Nursing, 30(8), 484-489
Ingebretsen, L. P., & Sagbakken, M. (2016). Hospice nurses’ emotional challenges in their encounters with the dying. International journal of qualitative studies on health and wellbeing, 11(1), 31170.
Ingebretsen, L. P., & Sagbakken, M. (2016). Hospice nurses' emotional challenges in their encounters with the dying. International journal of qualitative studies on health and wellbeing, 11(1), 31170
Kamal, A., Bull, J. H., Wolf, S. P., Swetz, K. M., Shanafelt, T. D., Ast, K., ... & Sinclair, C. T. (2020). Letter to the editor regarding “prevalence and predictors of burnout among hospice and palliative care professionals”. Journal of Pain and Symptom Management, 59(2), e3-e5
Lovallo, W. R. (2016). Stress and health: Biological and psychological interactions. https://doi.org/10.4135/9781071801390
Machado, D. A., Figueiredo, N. M., Velasques, L. D., Bento, C. A., Machado, W. C., & Vianna, L. A. (2018). Cognitive changes in nurses working in intensive care units. Revista Brasileira de Enfermagem, 71(1), 73-79. https://doi.org/10.1590/0034-7167-2016-0513
McKenna, L., & Gray, R. (2018). The importance of ethics in research publications. Collegian, 25(2), 147-148.
Peters, L., Cant, R., Payne, S., O’Connor, M., Mcdermott, F., Hood, K., ... & Shimoinaba, K. (2013). How death anxiety impacts nurses’ caring for patients at the end of life: a review of literature. The open nursing journal, 7, 14.
Rodrigues, V. M., & Ferreira, A. S. (2011). Stressors in nurses working in intensive care units. Revista Latino-Americana de Enfermagem, 19(4), 1025-1032. https://doi.org/10.1590/s0104-11692011000400023
Su, J., Weng, H., Tsang, H., & Wu, J. (2009). Mental health and quality of life among doctors, nurses and other hospital staff. Stress and Health, 25(5), 423-430. https://doi.org/10.1002/smi.1261
Teoli, D., & Bhardwaj, A. (2022). Quality Of Life. https://www.ncbi.nlm.nih.gov/books/NBK536962/
Toussaint, L., Shields, G. S., Dorn, G., & Slavich, G. M. (2014). Effects of lifetime stress exposure on mental and physical health in young adulthood: How stress degrades and forgiveness protects health. Journal of Health Psychology, 21(6), 1004-1014. https://doi.org/10.1177/1359105314544132
Watson M, Campbell R, Vallath M, Ward S, Wells J. Oxford Handbook of Palliative Care, 3rd edn. New York, NY: Oxford University Press; 2019